The Albac is a left tributary of the river Hârtibaciu in Romania. It discharges into the Hârtibaciu west of the village Vărd.

References

Rivers of Romania
Rivers of Sibiu County